The Helping Hand (literally "For the Little Ones") was a 1908 French short silent film by Georges Méliès.

Plot
An impoverished father, with his young son and daughter, begs for food in a marketplace. When a merchant angrily turns them away, their plight attracts the attention of a woman of charity. Calling shame upon the unkind merchant, she buys the poor family some food, talks with the family, and adopts the two children. Marketplace workers, witnessing the scene, give the father work as a sign carrier.

Release
The Helping Hand was sold by Méliès's Star Film Company and is numbered 1326–1328 in its catalogues. The American trade periodical The Moving Picture World, in a brief notice about some of Méliès' films, praised The Helping Hand for offering "a wholesome lesson of charity."

The film is currently presumed lost.

References

External links
 

French black-and-white films
Films directed by Georges Méliès
French silent short films
Lost French films